Jukun (Njikum) are an ethno-linguistic group or ethnic nation in West Africa. The Jukun are traditionally located in Taraba, Benue, Nasarawa, Plateau, Adamawa, and Gombe States in Nigeria and parts of northwestern Cameroon. They are descendants of the people of Kwararafa. Most of the tribes in the north central of Nigeria trace their origin to the Jukun people and are related in one way or the other to the Jukuns. Until the coming of both Christianity and Islam, the Jukun people were followers of their own traditional religions. Most of the tribes, Alago, Agatu, Rendere, Goemai in Shendam, and others left Kwararafa when it disintegrated as a result of a power tussle . The Jukuns are divided into two major groups; the Jukun Wanu and Jukun Wapa. The Jukun Wanu are fishermen residing along the banks of the river Benue and Niger where they run through Taraba State, Benue State and Nasarawa State. The Wukari Federation, headed by the Aku Uka of Wukari, is now the main centre of the Jukun people.

Population and demographics
Writing in the late 1920s, the British anthropologist C. K. Meek estimated that there were approximately 25,000 Jukun-speakers then alive. Meek noted that the majority of the Jukun lived in scattered groups around the Benue basin, in an area that roughly corresponded to the extent of the kingdom of Kwararafa as it existed in the 18th century . That area of Jukun habitation, Meek noted, was bounded by Abinsi to the west, Kona to the east, Pindiga to the north and Donga to the south.

The language can be divided into six separate dialects: Wukari, Donga, Kona, Gwana and Pindiga, Jibu, and finally Wase Tofa, although Meek noted that the dialects of "Kona, Gwana and Pindiga differ so little that they may be regarded as one."

History

Kwararafa

The Jukun-speaking peoples trace their ancestry to the rulers of the kingdom of Kwararafa, a state which existed in Western Africa from the 14th through to the 18th centuries. Traditionally, Jukun society was governed by a monarch .

Modern history
As a result of the Fulani conquests at the beginning of the 19th century, the Jukun-speaking peoples became politically divided into various regional factions. By the 1920s, the main body of the Jukun population, known as the Wapâ, resided in and around Wukari, where they were governed by the local king and his administration. Other Jukun-speaking peoples living in the Benue basin, such as Jukun wanu of Abinsi, Awei District, Donga and Takum, remained politically separate from the Wukari government, and the Jukun-speakers in Adamawa Province recognised the governorship of the Fulani Emir of Muri.

In the post-colonial period, Nigeria has suffered violence, the result of multiple ethnic tensions among the different communities living in the country . Tensions exist between the Jukun and the neighbouring Tiv people, who migrated from Congo

Studies
In 1931, the academic publishing company Kegan Paul, Trubner & Co. published A Sudanese Kingdom: An Ethnographic Study of the Jukun-speaking Peoples of Nigeria, a book which had been written by the Briton C. K. Meek, the Anthropological Officer stationed with the Administrative Service in Nigeria.

List of Notable Jukun people
David Sabo Kente, businessman, politician and philanthropist 
Jesse Jagz, rapper, record producer and songwriter 
Kuvyon II, Aku Uka (paramount ruler) of Kwararafa 
M.I Abaga, hip hop recording artist and record producer

References

Footnotes

Bibliography

 

Ethnic groups in Nigeria